The Life of the Rover is a 1969 album by the music group The Irish Rovers.

Track listing 
Side One:
"Fifi O'Toole"
"Pleasant and Delightful"
"Orange Nickelodeon"
"King of the Fairies"
"Molecatcher"
"Wynken, Blynken, and Nod"
Side Two:
"Sullivan's John"
"Bunclody Cuckoo"
"Sam Hall"
"Banks of Newfoundland"
"Life of the Rover"

External links 
The Life of the Rover: the Irish Rovers at The Balladeers
The Irish Rovers Official Website

The Irish Rovers albums
1969 albums
Decca Records albums